The 1976 All-Ireland Senior Football Championship Final was the 89th All-Ireland Final and the deciding match of the 1976 All-Ireland Senior Football Championship, an inter-county Gaelic football tournament for the top teams in Ireland.

Dublin won the second of the famous Kerry–Dublin 1970s duels with a seven-point win, goals coming from John McCarthy, Jimmy Keaveney, and Brian Mullins. It was Dublin's first championship win over Kerry since 1934.	

Dublin manager Kevin Heffernan declared: "I've waited 21 years for this".

Kerry blamed a cancelled training session. The players asked for this because of "fatigue" though they also wished to take up a Beamish and Crawford invitation to the Tralee Races.

References

All-Ireland Senior Football Championship Final
All-Ireland Senior Football Championship Final, 1976
All-Ireland Senior Football Championship Finals
All-Ireland Senior Football Championship Finals
Dublin county football team matches
Kerry county football team matches